Mikel Coffee Company, or Mikel, is a rapidly expanding Greek coffeehouse chain, whose network consists of more than 350 coffee shops in 17 countries throughout the globe.

History 
MIKEL launched its first coffee store in 2008 in the city of Larissa. In the years that followed, MIKEL gradually expanded throughout Greece with the city of Volos being the starting point. As of recently, MIKEL has expanded beyond Greece, launching its first coffee store in the United Arab Emirates in 2016. The company has already opened four stores in Dubai and imposed itself as an important competitor in its sector. As of March 2018, the company has also begun operating in London. As of August 2018, the company has also opened their first store in Australia. As of September 2018, the company has also opened their first store in U.S.A. Since then, the company has established a presence in many Middle East countries and elsewhere.

Company Milestones:

2008: The first Mikel store opens in Larissa.

2010: Establishment of Georgia Fresh Flavors

2011: Establishment of Mikel Coffee Company S.A.

2012: Creation of Mikel Franchise network with 10 franchise stores

2013: Mikel stores reach 60. First store in Athens.

2014: 100 Mikel stores all over Greece.

2015: Establishment of the UK based Mikel Coffee Company Ltd. based in London and aimed at international development.

2016: Mikel enters the United Arab Emirates market where there are 4 stores.

2017: Completion of Master Franchise agreement in Cyprus, with 24 branches.

2018: Openings in the UK (London), Australia (Sydney), United States (Southampton, MA) and Bulgaria.

2019: Openings in Saudi Arabia (Jeddah) and Egypt (Cairo). Counting 240 stores worldwide.

2020: Openings in Romania, Turkey, Canada and North Macedonia.

2021: Openings in Kuwait and Oman. 

2022: Openings in Jordan and Qatar. 

2023: Counting 350 stores worldwide.

Brand 
The brand name, stylized as "MIKEL," stands for "Maybe it's knowledge entering life", the company's motto. The brand logo features the father of its founder, Eleftherios Kyriakakis.

Locations 
As of March 2023 there were 350 stores in the following 17 countries

References 

Greek companies established in 2008
Coffeehouses and cafés in Greece
Greek brands
Companies based in Larissa
Food and drink companies established in 2008